Denis J. O'Connell (January 28, 1849 – January 1, 1927) was an Irish-born American prelate of the Roman Catholic Church.  He served as bishop of the Diocese of Richmond in Virginia from 1912 to 1926.  He previously served as an auxiliary bishop of the Archdiocese of San Francisco in California from 1908 to 1912.

Before becoming a bishop, O'Connell served as rector of the Pontifical North American College in Rome, then as rector of the Catholic University of America in Washington, D.C.

Biography

Early life 
O'Connell was born on January 28, 1849, in Donoughmore, County Cork to Michael and Bridget O'Connell. His family emigrated to the United States and settled in Columbia, South Carolina, where his father's two brothers, Jeremiah and Joseph O'Connell, were serving as missionary priests.

As a young man, O'Connell felt called to be a priest and entered St. Charles College in Ellicott City, Maryland, in 1868. In part due to the influence of his uncles, in 1871 he was sent to Rome to study at the Pontifical North American College.  "So brilliant was the young man that at his examination for the degree of Doctor of Divinity the cardinal prefect and examining professors accorded it to him by acclamation instead of by the usual method of balloting."

Priesthood 
O'Connell was ordained in Rome for the Diocese of Richmond on May 26, 1877, by Cardinal Raffaele La Valletta.

When Bishop James Gibbons was appointed archbishop of the Archdiocese of  Baltimore, he sent O'Connell to Rome in November as his procurator to accept the bishop's pallium. In 1884, O'Connell became secretary to Gibbons, and was sent to Rome with the decrees of the Third Plenary Council of Baltimore. 

In 1885, O'Connell was appointed rector of the North American College a position he held until 1895. In 1887, he was given the papal honor of domestic prelate with the title of monsignor.Upon his return to Richmond, O'Connell was assigned to St. Peter's Parish. From 1903 to 1909, he served as the third rector of The Catholic University of America

On December 16, 1907, O'Connell was appointed as titular bishop of Sebaste in Phrygia by Pope Pius X.  O'Connell was consecrated at Cathedral of the Assumption of the Blessed Virgin Mary in Baltimore by Cardinal Gibbons on May 3, 1908.

Auxiliary Bishop of San Francisco 
On December 24, 1908, O'Connell was appointed by Pius X as an auxiliary bishop for the Archdiocese of San Francisco

Bishop of Richmond 
On January 19, 1912,  O'Connell was appointed as the seventh bishop of the Diocese of Richmond by Pius X.

O'Connell's resignation due to health reasons as bishop of the Diocese of Richmond was accepted by the pope on January 15, 1926; he was named the titular bishop of Mariamme.

Denis O'Connell died on January 1, 1927, in Richmond at age 77. Bishop Denis J. O'Connell High School in Arlington, Virginia, founded when the location was still part of the Diocese of Richmond, is named for him.

References

1849 births
1927 deaths
19th-century Irish people
People from County Cork
Irish emigrants to the United States (before 1923)
American Roman Catholic clergy of Irish descent
Pontifical North American College alumni
Pontifical North American College rectors
Presidents of the Catholic University of America
Roman Catholic bishops of Richmond
20th-century Roman Catholic bishops in the United States
Burials at the Cathedral of the Sacred Heart (Richmond, Virginia)